Dr. Károly Kontrát (born 12 April 1956) is a Hungarian jurist and politician who currently serves as Secretary of State of the Ministry of Interior since 2 June 2010. He is also a member of the National Assembly (MP) since 2002.

Personal life
He is married and has three children.

References

External links
 Országgyűlés biography 

1956 births
Living people
Hungarian jurists
Fidesz politicians
Members of the National Assembly of Hungary (2002–2006)
Members of the National Assembly of Hungary (2006–2010)
Members of the National Assembly of Hungary (2010–2014)
Members of the National Assembly of Hungary (2014–2018)
Members of the National Assembly of Hungary (2018–2022)
Members of the National Assembly of Hungary (2022–2026)
People from Pápa